"Leave It There" is a Christian hymn composed in 1916 by African-American Methodist minister Charles A. Tindley. It has become popular enough to have been included in 12 hymnals; and even to be attributed to "traditional" or "anonymous". The title is sometimes given as "Take Your Burden to the Lord and Leave It There" or as "Take Your Burden to the Lord" or as "Take Your Burden", words taken from the song's refrain; the plurals "burdens" and "them" are sometimes used, and "God" instead of "the Lord":

Origins of the lyrics 
The song relates to Psalm 55:22:

and to Christ's words in the Gospel of Matthew at 11:28-30:

It also relates to the Gospel of Matthew at 6:26:

Recording history 

On December 2, 1927, the song was recorded in gospel blues style by Washington Phillips (vocals and zither). According to the book Country Music Records : A Discography, 1921-1942: A Discography, 1921-1942, on December 13, 1927, it was recorded by Frank and James McCravy.  On June 30, 1928, it was recorded in gospel style by the Pace Jubilee Singers (chorus, singing in close harmony) with Hattie Parker (vocal soloist) and piano accompaniment. On December 11, 1929, it was recorded in gospel blues style by Blind Willie Johnson (vocals (using his "growl" (false bass) voice throughout) and guitar) and Willie B. Harris (vocals), who is thought to have been his first wife. Despite their closeness in time both to each other and to the date of composition, those three early versions are stylistically very different.

The song has since been recorded many times in a wide variety of styles; mostly gospel-based, but a few blues- or country-based. Some recordings misattribute authorship to Johnson or to Phillips instead of to Tindley; some artists have even claimed that it was their own composition.

Recordings 

 19231936Snowball and Sunshine, "Leave It There"  included on the 2012 compilation album Work Hard, Play Hard, Pray Hard: Hard Time, Good Time & End Time Music 19231936 
 1927Washington Phillips, "Take Your Burden to the Lord and Leave It There" 10" 78rpm single Columbia 14277-D 
 1927Ruth Donaldson & Helen Jepsen, "Leave It There" 10" 78rpm single Gennett 6241 
 1928Pace Jubilee Singers with Hattie Parker, "Leave It There"  10" 78rpm single Victor 21551-B 
 1929Blind Willie Johnson, "Take Your Burden to the Lord and Leave It There" 10" 78rpm single Columbia 14520-D 
 192934Blind Joe Taggart, "Take Your Burden to the Lord" 
 192936Blind Roosevelt Graves and Uaroy Graves, "Take Your Burden to the Lord" 
 193839Golden Gate Quartet, "Take Your Burden(s) to God" 
 193839Shelby Gospel Four, "Take Your Burden to the Lord" 
 1951Dorothy Love Coates and the Original Gospel Harmonettes, "Take Your Burden to the Lord and Leave It There"  first released in 1994 on the album Women of Gospel's Golden Age, Vol. 1 
 1951Famous Ward Singers, "Take Your Burden to the Lord"  Savoy Records 4033 
 195253Tommy Duncan, "Take Your Burden to the Lord" 
 1962James Cleveland and the Angelic Choir, "Leave It There" Savoy Records 4188 
 1963Eureka Brass Band, "Take Your Burden to the Lord"  on the album Jazz at Preservation Hall, Vol. 1 
 1964Kid Thomas Valentine, Emanuel Paul and Kid Sheik, "Take Your Burden to the Lord"  on the album The Three Kings 
 1965Joseph Spence, "Take Your Burden to the Lord and Leave It There" 
 1966The Statesmen Quartet with Hovie Lister, "Leave It There"  on the album The Happy Sound of the Statesmen Quartet with Hovie Lister 
 1967The Incredible String Band, "Take Your Burden to the Lord"  first released in 2006 on the album The Circle Is Unbroken: Live and Studio 19671972  
 1967Warner Mack, "Leave It There"  on the album Songs We Sang in Church and Home 
 1970Dock Boggs, "Leave It There"  on the album Dock Boggs, Volume 3 
 1972Jeffrey Shurtleff, "Leave It There"  on the album State Farm 
 1973Blind Arvella Gray, "Take Your Burden to the Lord"  on the album The Singing Drifter 
 1973Sensational Nightingales, "Take Your Burdens to the Lord"  on the album You and I and Everyone 
 1975 Percy Humphrey and His Crescent City Joymakers, "Take Your Burden to the Lord" on the album Climax Rag 
 1976William Truckaway, "Leave It There"  on the album Breakaway 
 1992Al Hobbs and the Indy Mass Choir, "Leave It There"  on the album All Is Well 
 1993Tanya Goodman, "Leave It There"  on the album Innocent Eyes 
 1994Rev. W. Leo Daniels with Mrs. Nevarro Daniels, "Leave It There"  on the album So Happy 
 1995Blind Connie Williams, "Take Your Burden to the Lord"  on the album Philadelphia Street Singer 
 1995The Fairfield Four, "Leave It There"  on the album Standing on the Rock 
 1995Georgia Mass Choir, "Take Your Burden to the Lord"  on the album Lord Take Me Through 
 1995Jimmy Hill and The Anointed Voices of Power, "Take Your Burden to the Lord"  on the album Stop the Violence 
 1995The Horizon Family, "Leave It There"  on the album Singing at the National Quartet Convention 
 1996Bill and Gloria Gaither, "Leave It There"  on the album Moments to Remember 
 1996The Gospel Midgets, "Leave It There"  on the album Whatcha Gonna Do 
 1996Rev. Oris Mays, "Take Your Burden to the Lord"  on the album The Milky White Way 
 1997William Abney, "Take Your Burden to the Lord"  on the album Songs of Grace 
 1998Clarence Clay and William Scott, "Take Your Burdens to the Lord"  on the album Standing on the Highway 
 1998Dwight Gordon, "Take Your Burden"  on the album I've Been Waiting 
 1998Rev. Raymond Wise and Family, "Leave It There"  on the album Family: Singing Familiar Songs and Sayings 
 1999Willie Eason with The Campbell Brothers, "Take Your Burden to the Lord" on the album Sacred SteelLive! 
 2000Soulful Heavenly Stars of New Orleans, "Take Your Burden to the Lord"  on the album Who We Are 
 2000Sensational Southern Nightingales featuring Sidney Brown, "Take Your Burden to the Lord"  on the album God's Given Touch 
 2001-N-Retro, "Leave It There"  on the album Easy Listening Gospel 
 2001Shirley Sydnour and Erik Trauner, "Take Your Burden to the Lord"  on the album I'll Fly Away 
 2002Body of Baptized Believers, "Leave It There"  on the album No Question 
 2002Ehmandah, "Leave It There"  on the album Spiritually Gifted: Speaking from the Soul 
 2002Randall Goodgame, "Leave It There"  on the album The Hymnal 
 2002Rev. Phillip E. Knight, Sr., "Leave It There"  on the album Save a Seat for Me 
 2003Gaither Vocal Band, "Leave It There"  on the album A Cappella
 2003Lynda Randle, "Leave It There"  on the album Timeless 
 2004Jay Jay Bell and Friends, "Leave It There  on the album Lord Send Me, I'll Go 
 2004Ray Skjelbred, "Take Your Burden to the Lord"  on the album Plays Blues & Boogie Woogie 
 2005 The Grace Thrillers, "Take Your Burden to the Lord"  on the albums He Brought Me Out  and Old Favourites 
 2006The Baker Girls, "Leave It There"  on the album Don't Let the Makeup Fool You  
 2006John Cowan and Tony Rice, "Leave It There"  on the album Voice of the Spirit, Gospel of the South 
 2006Jessy Dixon, "Leave It There"  on the album Homecoming Classics 
 20072nd Chance, "Leave It There"  on the album  Heavenly Highway (The Highway to Heaven) 
 2007A. Bruce Frazier, "Leave It There"  on the album That Old Time Religion: Now and Then 
 2007Barry Martyn, "Leave It There"  on the album Jazz Hymn Fest 
 2007Dudley Smith, "Leave It There"  on the album Dudley Smith ... Is Havin' Church! 
 2007Wings of Heaven, "Leave It There"  on the album Upper Room Experience 
 2008Bill Gaither, "Leave It There"  on the DVD A Campfire Homecoming 
 2008Kevin Gould, "Leave It There"  on the album A Wineskin in the Smoke 
 2009Lance Odegard, "Leave It There"  on the album After a Long Hard Winter, It's Good to Go Home 
 2010Otis Byrd, Jr and Adoration  on the album The Experience 
 2010Garden State Choral Chapter, "Leave It There"  on the album Reunion 
 2010Greg Lowery, "Leave It There"  on the album '' 
 2010Stan Whitmire, "Leave It There"  on the album Shelter in the Storm 
 2012Mississippi Chris Sharp, "Take Your Burden To the Lord and Leave It There"  on the album Redbugs 
 2012 Munirih Sparrow, "Leave It There"  on the album Nightsong 
 2013The Blind Boys of Alabama, "Take Your Burden to the Lord and Leave It There"  on the album I'll Find a Way 
 2013Joey + Rory, "Leave It There"  on the album Inspired: Songs of Faith & Family 
 2013Stuart MacDonald, "Leave It There" on the album Leave It There 
 2013Pig Irön, "Take Your Burden to the Lord"  on the album Sermons From the Church of Blues Restitution 
 2014Sue Dodge, Lillie Knauls, Barbie Mason, The Stamps and J. D. Sumner, "Leave It There"  on the album Bill Gaither's 30 Favorite Homecoming Hymns. (This version must have been recorded before Sumner's death in 1998.)
 2015DeBusk-Weaver Family, "Leave It There"  on the album Ola Belle Reed and Southern Mountain Music on the Mason-Dixon Line 
 2015Girish, "Leave It There"  on the album Sky of the Heart 

 Other songs 

These songs have related titles to the Tindley song, but differ from it and from each other:

 1965Pilgrim Jubilee Singers, "Take Your Burden to Jesus"; a different gospel song, perhaps based on the Tindley song
 1995Odds, "Leave It There"  on the album Good Weird Feeling 1997F. C. Barnes, "Take Your Burden (to Jesus)"  on the albums Keep Me All the Way  and A Live Reunion; a different gospel song
 2002Juanita Wynn, "Leave It There"  on the album U Don't Know; a different gospel song. It quotes the second line of the refrain of the Tindley song, and may have been inspired by it
 2003Laura Frawley, "Leave It There"  on the album Come Up Higher''; a different gospel song. It has some similarities of wording to the Tindley song, and may have been inspired by it

References 

American Christian hymns
Blues songs
Gospel songs
Hymns by Charles Albert Tindley
1916 songs
Washington Phillips songs
Columbia Records singles
Pace Jubilee Singers songs
Victor Records singles
Blind Willie Johnson songs